Arie Huibrecht Dignus "Aad" Wagenaar (born 4 December 1940, Gouda) is a former Dutch politician for the Reformatory Political Federation (RPF) and the Groep Wagenaar which he founded on 20 April 1985, and Anti-Revolutionairen 1985 (AR-85).

He became a teacher of religion and civics and was a  spokesman for defense and foreign policy. He was understanding towards the South African apartheid regime and was strongly opposed by the Dutch peace movement. He unsuccessfully participated in the Lower House elections of 1986. In 1987 he became a member of the CDA.

Wagenaar is a practicing member of the Reformed Churches in the Netherlands.

See also
List of Dutch politicians

References

1940 births
Living people
Protestant Church Christians from the Netherlands
Members of the House of Representatives (Netherlands)
People from Gouda, South Holland
Reformatory Political Federation politicians
Anti-Revolutionary Party politicians